Sung Hwan Kim (born 1975 in Seoul, South Korea) is a contemporary artist who grew up in South Korea and is currently based in New York. He also worked in the Netherlands for four years serving as a fellow at the Rijksakademie van Beeldende Kunsten. He developed the "In the room" series in which he tells a story by combining installation, text, film/video, and music. The music is made in collaboration with dogr (a.k.a. David Michael DiGregorio, a musician currently based in New York). As he says, "I know that it doesn't matter if things are true or not, but this is a true story," at the start of his video From the Commanding Heights…(2007), his storytelling joins fantasy and rumors as well as his actual cultural experiences.

His performances and stories take slightly different versions of variation through improvisation just like fairy tales, myths, magic, lies, history, or sometimes fact are often told through variation such as exaggeration, deletion, intonation, rhythm, texture of voice, and usage of timbre. The artist integrates video and performance playing the multiple roles as director, editor, performer, composer, narrator, and poet.

References

External links
 

South Korean contemporary artists
South Korean expatriates in the Netherlands
South Korean expatriates in the United States
Living people
1975 births
People from Seoul
Artists from New York City